Irene Adler is a fictional character in the Sherlock Holmes stories written by Sir Arthur Conan Doyle. A former opera singer and actress, she was featured in the short story "A Scandal in Bohemia", published in July 1891. Adler is one of the most notable female characters in the Sherlock Holmes series, despite appearing in only one story. While not technically a criminal and bearing no malice towards Holmes, she outsmarts him and evades his traps. Sherlock Holmes refers to her afterward respectfully as "the Woman."

In the original Doyle story, Watson notes Holmes has no romantic interest in Adler or in women in general, pointing out the detective only exhibits a platonic admiration for her wit and cunning. Despite this, some derivative works reinterpret Adler as a romantic interest for Holmes or as a former love who later regularly engages in crime.

Fictional character biography

Irene Adler appears only in "A Scandal in Bohemia". Her name is briefly mentioned in "A Case of Identity", "The Adventure of the Blue Carbuncle", and "His Last Bow".

According to "A Scandal in Bohemia", Adler is born in New Jersey in 1858. She has a career in opera as a contralto, performing at La Scala in Milan, Italy, and a term as prima donna in the Imperial Opera of Warsaw, Poland, indicating she is a talented and skilled singer. In Poland, she becomes the lover of Wilhelm Gottsreich Sigismond von Ormstein, Grand Duke of Cassel-Felstein and King of Bohemia (then only the Crown Prince), who was staying in Warsaw for a period. The King describes her as "a well-known adventuress" (a term widely used at the time in ambiguous association with "courtesan") who has "the face of the most beautiful of women and the mind of the most resolute of men." Adler is trained as an actress and "often" disguises herself as a man to "take advantage of the freedom which it gives." The two keep their relationship a secret, but exchange letters and have a photograph taken together that Adler keeps. The King returns to Prague, while Adler, now in her late twenties, retires and moves to London.

In 1888, the 30-year-old King intends to marry Clotilde Lothman von Saxe-Meiningen, second daughter of the King of Scandinavia. Learning of this, Adler promises if he officially announces the betrothal then she will send their photograph to his fiancée's family, a dangerous act since the Scandinavian royal family will consider it a scandal for the King of Bohemia to have been romantically involved with an actress of the lower classes. The king sends agents to retrieve the photograph, but multiple attempts fail.

On 20 March, the King asks the famous detective Sherlock Holmes to secure possession of the photograph. A disguised Holmes traces Adler's movements, noting she is "a lovely woman, with a face a man might die for." While disguised, he discovers Adler is in a relationship with Godfrey Norton, an English lawyer, and witnesses the two make a hasty marriage. Spotting the disguised Holmes, Adler asks him to be the wedding's official witness and gives him a sovereign coin for his trouble.

Later, Holmes disguises himself as an elderly cleric and uses trickery to gain access to Adler's home and learn where the photograph is hidden. Satisfied, he leaves. Adler concludes the cleric is really Holmes, whom she was warned about. Disguising herself as a young man, she visits Holmes' address of 221B Baker Street. Seeing John Watson with the same cleric she met earlier, she wishes them good night as she walks past them.

The next morning, Holmes visits Adler's home with Watson and the King to retrieve the photograph. Adler is gone, along with her new husband and the photo, leaving behind a photograph of herself alone as well as a letter written to Holmes explaining how she saw through his trick and confirmed her suspicion. The letter further explains that after making her threat to the King she met her new husband and is happy with him, meaning she no longer intends to compromise the King (though she is keeping the photo to protect herself against any further action). Admiring Adler, the King remarks it is "a pity that she was not on my level." When offered a reward by the King for his efforts, Holmes asks for the photograph Adler left behind. Watson notes that Holmes keeps the photograph in his desk afterward and adds Adler's sovereign coin to his watch chain. Watson also notes that Holmes holds no romantic affection or attraction to Adler, yet holds her in great respect and often refers to her afterward by the respectful title of "the Woman."

In the opening paragraph of the short story, Watson calls her "the late Irene Adler", suggesting she is deceased. It has been speculated, however, that the word "late" might actually mean "former" and is a reference to her changing her last name after marrying Godfrey Norton. Doyle employs this same usage of the word "late" in "The Adventure of the Priory School" in reference to the Duke's former status as a cabinet minister.

In "The Five Orange Pips", Holmes says he has "been beaten four times – three times by men and once by a woman." If this woman is Adler, this contradicts the timeline of the stories. "A Scandal in Bohemia" takes place "on the twentieth of March, 1888"; "The Five Orange Pips" takes place before this in "the year '87." Doyle's stories contain several minor contradictions and unclear points, including the location of Watson's war injury, how many times Watson is married, and the first name of Professor James Moriarty.

Character sources

Adler's career as a theatrical performer who becomes the lover of a powerful aristocrat had several precedents. One is Lola Montez, a dancer who became the lover of Ludwig I of Bavaria and influenced national politics. Montez is suggested as a model for Adler by several writers.

Another possibility is the actor Lillie Langtry, the lover of Edward, the Prince of Wales. Writing in 1957, Julian Wolff, a member of the literary society The Baker Street Irregulars, comments that it was well known that Langtry was born in Jersey (she was called the "Jersey Lily") and Adler is born in New Jersey. Langtry had later had several other aristocratic lovers, and her relationships had been speculated upon in the public press in the years before Doyle's story was published. Another suggestion is the dancer Ludmilla Stubel, the alleged lover and later wife of Archduke Johann Salvator of Austria.

Holmes' relationship to Adler
Adler earns Holmes's unbounded admiration. When the King of Bohemia says, "Would she not have made an admirable queen?  Is it not a pity she was not on my level?" Holmes drily replies that Adler is indeed on a much different level from the King.

The beginning of "A Scandal in Bohemia" describes the high regard in which Holmes held Irene Adler:

This "memory" is kept alive by a photograph of Irene Adler, which had been deliberately left behind when she and her new husband took flight with the embarrassing photograph of her with the King. Holmes had then asked for and received this photo from the King, as payment for his work on the case.

In derivative works, she is frequently used as a romantic interest for Holmes, a departure from Doyle's story where he only admired her for her wit and cunning. In his Sherlock Holmes Handbook, Christopher Redmond writes "the Canon provides little basis for either sentimental or prurient speculation about a Holmes–Adler connection."

Name pronunciation
Different pronunciations of Irene Adler's first name have been proposed. The traditional British pronunciation of the name is "Eye-ree-nee", which has been used for Adler's first name in some adaptations, including the BBC 1989–1998 radio series. The standard American pronunciation of the name, "Eye-reen", would be appropriate since Adler is said to be from New Jersey. It may also be pronounced this way in modern British usage. This pronunciation has been used in television adaptations such as Elementary and Sherlock. Another pronunciation, "Ayr-ray-na", was used in the Granada television series. This pronunciation has a "continental flavour" fitting Adler's career as an opera singer in continental Europe.

Adaptations

Books
In his fictional biographies Sherlock Holmes of Baker Street (1962) and Nero Wolfe of West Thirty-fifth Street (1969), William S. Baring-Gould puts forth an argument that Adler and Holmes meet again after the latter's supposed death at Reichenbach Falls. They perform on stage together incognito, and become lovers. According to Baring-Gould, Holmes and Adler's union produces one son, Nero Wolfe, who would follow in his father's footsteps as a detective.

In two novels by John Lescroart published in 1986 and 1987, it is stated that Adler and Holmes had a son, Auguste Lupa, and it is implied that he later changes his name to Nero Wolfe.

A series of mystery novels written by Carole Nelson Douglas (1990–2004) features Irene Adler as the protagonist and sleuth, chronicling her life shortly before (in the novel Good Night, Mr. Holmes) and after her notable encounter with Sherlock Holmes and which feature Holmes as a supporting character. Douglas provides Irene with a back story as a child vaudeville performer who was trained as an opera singer before going to work as a Pinkerton detective. In the books, Douglas strongly implies that Irene's mother was Lola Montez and her father possibly Ludwig I of Bavaria. The series includes Godfrey Norton as Irene's supportive barrister husband; Penelope "Nell" Huxleigh, a vicar's daughter and former governess who is Irene's best friend and biographer; and Nell's love interest Quentin Stanhope. Historical characters such as Oscar Wilde, Bram Stoker, Alva Vanderbilt and Consuelo Vanderbilt, and journalist Nellie Bly, among others, also make appearances.

Irene Adler appears as an opera singer in the 1993 pastiche The Canary Trainer, where she encounters Holmes during his three-year 'death' while he is working as a violinist in the Paris Opera House, and asks him to help her protect her friend and unofficial protégé, Christine Daaé, from the 'Opera Ghost'.

In the 2009 novel The Language of Bees by Laurie R. King, it is stated Irene Adler is deceased when the book takes place and once had an affair with Sherlock Holmes. The story reveals she gave birth to a son, Damian Adler, an artist now known as The Addler.

Comic books
Marvel Comics character Destiny (Irene Adler) is a mutant with precognitive abilities. Destiny's connection to Sherlock Holmes stories had long being teased through her lover Mystique's past as a consulting detective, as both women were active in the late 19th century. Immortal X-Men #8 (2022) by Kieron Gillen explicitly canonized the connection, presenting Holmes as an identity used by Mystique and Destiny as her companion.

Manga
In the 2016 manga series Moriarty the Patriot,  is featured as an expert cross-dresser and spy who impersonates the King of Bohemia to trick Sherlock Holmes and John Watson into taking her on as a roommate without pay.

Films
In the 1946 film Dressed to Kill, Adler is mentioned early in the film when Holmes and Watson discuss the events of "A Scandal in Bohemia."

She is portrayed by Rachel McAdams in the 2009 film Sherlock Holmes. In that film, she is a femme fatale. A skilled professional thief, as well as a divorcée, Adler is no longer married to Godfrey Norton, and needs Holmes' help for the case. She and Holmes are depicted as having a deep and mutual infatuation, even while she is employed by Professor Moriarty.

McAdams reprised the role in the 2011 sequel Sherlock Holmes: A Game of Shadows in which Moriarty, deeming her position compromised by her love for Holmes, poisons and (apparently) kills her. Moriarty taunts Holmes about murdering Adler, and Holmes swears revenge, leading to their climactic battle at Reichenbach Falls.

Radio
Margaret Ward voiced Irene Adler in a radio dramatisation of the short story "A Scandal in Bohemia" in 1954. The character was played by Gudrun Ure in a 1966 radio dramatisation of the same story. Both radio dramas aired on the BBC Light Programme. In 1977, Marian Seldes played Irene Adler in the CBS Radio Mystery Theater radio adaptation of "A Scandal in Bohemia".

Sarah Badel portrayed Irene Adler in the 7 November 1990 BBC Radio 4 broadcast of "A Scandal in Bohemia" opposite Clive Merrison's Holmes. Ellen McLain played Irene Adler in the Imagination Theatre radio dramatisation of "A Scandal in Bohemia", which aired on 17 June 2012.

Stage
Irene Adler was portrayed by Inga Swenson in the Broadway musical, Baker Street which also starred Fritz Weaver as Sherlock Holmes. According to the liner notes of the original cast album, the story makes extensive use of the story "A Scandal in Bohemia". The play opened at the Broadway Theatre, New York City, on 16 February 1965 and ran for 313 performances. The show's book was by Jerome Coopersmith and the music and lyrics were by Marian Grudeff and Raymond Jessel; the production was directed by Harold Prince.

Television series
Irene Adler was played by Olga Edwardes in the episode "A Scandal in Bohemia" in the 1951 TV series Sherlock Holmes.

In the 1984 Granada Television series The Adventures of Sherlock Holmes starring Jeremy Brett, the first episode is "A Scandal in Bohemia", in which Adler is played by Gayle Hunnicutt.

In "A Scandal in Belgravia", the first episode of the 2012 second series of the BBC Sherlock, Irene was portrayed by Lara Pulver opposite Benedict Cumberbatch as Holmes. She is initially sought to recover incriminating photos she possesses of a liaison between her and a female member of the Royal Family, along with various other incriminating documents kept in a password-protected phone. In many ways, this version of Irene Adler is the polar opposite of Doyle's original tale: In this version, she is not American, but English; while the original was a victim of prosecution falsely accused of being a courtesan, this one is a culprit and a known dominatrix who serves high-end clientele. While she appears to be intensely attracted to Sherlock, she identifies herself as gay and her attraction is later revealed to be a ruse. Most unlike the original, she consistently fails to best Sherlock and eventually ends up in his mercy. At the episode's conclusion, she is presumed killed by those she failed to provide with the information, but is secretly saved by Sherlock. She makes a cameo appearance as a figment of Sherlock's imagination in the episode "The Sign of Three", and sends Sherlock a card when he was shot in "His Last Vow" (seen only in the deleted scenes). In "The Lying Detective", Holmes receives a text that, from the text alert, John identifies as having come from Irene. Sherlock admits that Irene is alive, but states that he doesn't text back. John suggests that he do so, and later Sherlock admits that he has, in fact, responded to her texts.

In the CBS series, Elementary, Adler is initially an unseen character in the first season, mentioned first in "Flight Risk" (2012) as a former love interest of Holmes. It is later explained that she apparently died at the hands of a serial killer Holmes was investigating known as "M", an event that fuelled Sherlock's descent into heroin addiction. In "M", Sherlock confronts M, revealed to be Sebastian Moran, and is told that Irene was not killed by Moran, but by his employer: Moriarty. In "Risk Management", it is explained that Irene was an American art restorer living in London. Holmes discovers Irene is alive, having been kept as Moriarty's prisoner in a dilapidated house. After rescuing Irene, Holmes is confronted with a final plot twist in "The Woman" and "Heroine": Irene Adler is his nemesis, Jamie Moriarty (gender-swapped from her literary counterpart). Moriarty created the Irene identity to seduce Holmes, and subsequently faked her own death to distract him from possibly uncovering her criminal activities. Natalie Dormer played Adler/Moriarty in the final three episodes of the season.

In the 2013 Russian drama Sherlock Holmes, Irene Adler takes a major role in the series and is portrayed by Lyanka Gryu.

In the 2014 Japanese puppetry television show, Sherlock Holmes, broadcast on NHK (日本放送協会, Nippon Hōsō Kyōkai, Japan Broadcasting Corporation), Irene Adler is a school nurse of a fictional boarding school Beeton School. At first she has an affair with Headmaster Ormstein but takes up with another man Godfrey Norton who teaches art and sees through the plot of Holmes and Watson in "The Adventure of the Headmaster with Trouble" based on "A Scandal in Bohemia". She is voiced by Rie Miyazawa.

Irene Adler appears in the original anime television series Case File nº221: Kabukicho (2019–2020), voiced by Maaya Sakamoto. In the anime television series Moriarty the Patriot, Adler is voiced by Yōko Hikasa, taking on the male guise of James Bonde to work as a spy.

Television films
In the 1976 film Sherlock Holmes in New York, Adler (Charlotte Rampling) helps Holmes and Watson to solve a bank robbery organised by Holmes' nemesis, Professor Moriarty, after he takes her son hostage to prevent Holmes from investigating the case. Holmes and Watson later rescue the boy, with a final conversation between Holmes and Adler at the conclusion of the case implying that Holmes is in fact the boy's father. This version of Irene Adler is not an opera singer, but an actress.

Irene Adler is featured in Soviet director Igor Maslennikov's made-for-TV 5-part film series The Adventures of Sherlock Holmes and Dr. Watson. She appears in the fourth part, The Treasures of Agra (1983), based upon The Sign of the Four (main storyline) and A Scandal in Bohemia (flashback), in which Holmes and Watson, while waiting for the new information on his current case, remember their encounter with Irene Adler (played by Larisa Solovyova).

In the 1984 made-for-TV film The Masks of Death, a widowed Irene Adler, played by Anne Baxter, is a guest at Graf Udo Von Felseck (Anton Diffring)'s country house where Holmes (Peter Cushing) and Watson (John Mills) are investigating the supposed disappearance of a visiting prince. Although Holmes initially considers her a suspect, she proves her innocence and becomes an ally.

In the 1991 television film Sherlock Holmes and the Leading Lady, Irene Adler (Morgan Fairchild) reunites with an ageing Holmes (Christopher Lee) when a murder happens during her performance in Vienna. Holmes and Adler, whose flirtatious relationship with Sherlock is similar to Sherlock Holmes in New York‘s portrayal, briefly refer to past confrontations, including a rather confusing case where Adler had posed as a young boy to retrieve something hidden in Holmes's safe. Adler also explains that she was married for several years (Holmes having last seen her at the wedding previous to the film), only for her husband to die of illness two years before the film's events.

Liliana Komorowska portrayed Adler as a Polish opera singer in The Hallmark Channel's 2001 made-for-TV film The Royal Scandal opposite Matt Frewer's Holmes.

In 2007's BBC Television production Sherlock Holmes and the Baker Street Irregulars, Irene Adler (portrayed by Anna Chancellor) is the main villain of the piece and one of Sherlock Holmes' archenemies instead of a potential love interest.

TV episodes of unrelated series
In an episode of the PBS Kids show Wishbone, actress Sally Nystuen Vahle portrays Irene Adler for the adaptation of "A Scandal in Bohemia" entitled "A Dogged Espose" (1995).

In the television series House, James Wilson tells a story about a patient named Irene Adler, with whom Gregory House was obsessed and fell in love, in the 2008 episode "Joy to the World".

In "The 10 Li'l Grifters Job" (2011), the season 4 episode 2 of Leverage, the character Sophie portrays Irene Adler at the Murder Mystery Masquerade.

In the season five episode of The Flash entitled "Goldfaced" (2019), detective Sherloque Wells meets Renee Adler (portrayed by Kimberly Williams-Paisley), the Earth-1 doppelgänger of his five ex-wives. She is later shown to be a metahuman with possible telekinetic powers; upon seeing this, Sherloque vows to protect her from metahuman-serial killer Cicada. During the episode, Sherloque also has an encounter with four of his ex-wives, all of whom are variants of Adler. Now that they know which Earth he is on, they demand their back alimony payments be met within a month, or they will have a multiverse-traveling bounty hunter come and collect the payments for them.

Actresses who have played Irene Adler

Radio

Stage plays

Television and DTV films

Television series

Theatrical films

References

External links
 "A Few Words about theatres in Warsaw, or where Sang Irene Adler" by Joanna Polatynska with Catharina Polatynska
 "Irene Adler: Sherlock, Lupin And I" 

Female characters in film
Female characters in literature
Female characters in television
Fictional characters from New Jersey
Literary characters introduced in 1891
Fictional professional thieves
Fictional opera singers
Fictional singers
Sherlock Holmes characters
Crime film characters
Fictional people from the 19th-century